Bani Mubarez is a sub-district located in Al Qafr District, Ibb Governorate, Yemen. Bani Saif al-Alli had a population of  12865 as of 2004.

References 

Sub-districts in Al Qafr District